Raffaele Bazzoni (born 8 April 1953 in Zevio) is an Italian politician from Veneto.

A long-time Christian Democrat, he was elected to the Regional Council of Veneto for Forza Italia in 1995, 2000 and 2005. Between 1995 and 2000 he was regional minister of Transports in Galan I Government.

References

1953 births
Living people
Forza Italia politicians
People from the Province of Verona
Members of the Regional Council of Veneto